Currin, is a locality and townland in Magheracross Parish Northern Ireland. Currin is 327.46 acres in area.

The Currin area has a rich history.
St Patrick is said to have come through the area in 450AD. 
St Columba passed thorough the area in 550 AD 
Nearby Magheracross Monastery was founded about 749.
In 1867, Currin was reported to have had one Presbyterian and two Catholic churches, and three schools. Also a fair was held on 6 May.

References

Townlands of County Fermanagh
Civil parishes of County Fermanagh